John Evan Weston-Davies (25 February 1909 – 7 April 1996), known as Berkely Mather, was a British writer who wrote fifteen published novels and a book of short stories. He also wrote for radio, television and film.

Biography

Shortly before World War I, Mather's family emigrated to Australia, where he received his education. He studied medicine, the family profession at Sydney University. Finding himself in England without prospects at the height of the Great Depression, he enlisted in the Royal Horse Artillery, but failed to gain a commission. He therefore applied to join the Indian Army, in which he rose through the ranks, becoming a sergeant at the outbreak of World War II in 1939. He served in the Iraq campaign under Slim, and ended the war as an acting lieutenant-colonel. After India gained independence in 1947, he rejoined the British Army, serving in the Royal Artillery until he retired in 1959.

He scripted his first TV series, Tales From Soho in the mid-1950s. Produced by Tony Richardson, it featured his detective Inspector Charlesworth (played by John Welsh), who was used again in later productions. Other TV work included African Patrol, Z Cars, The Avengers and the American series I Spy. Mather's first novel, The Achilles Affair (1959), was a minor best-seller, and his second, The Pass Beyond Kashmir (1960), which received glowing reviews from Ian Fleming and Erle Stanley Gardner, did even better. Ernest Hemingway owned copies of both these novels. Mather's espionage thrillers can be read separately, but are linked to each other by recurring characters, in particular the sardonic and resourceful British agent Idwal Rees, who appears in The Pass Beyond Kashmir, The Terminators and Snowline. The author's military experience and years spent abroad give his work richness and depth. His last three novels were an ambitious trilogy that followed the fortunes of the Stafford family in the Near and Far East from the middle of the nineteenth century to the middle of the twentieth.

Two of Mather's early books stand somewhat apart from the rest in that they are spin-offs from his work in other media. Geth Straker (1962) started out as a radio serial, hence the tag on the front cover: "Further daring exploits from the log of radio's trouble hunting mariner". The book contains four stories. Genghis Khan (1965) is a novelisation of the 1965 film of the same name, for which he had written the original story. Mather's other motion picture credits include The Long Ships and Dr. No with Mather borrowing a copy of Fleming's original novel from his son. Mather also provided uncredited rewrites of the screenplays for From Russia with Love and Goldfinger.

James Bond film producers Albert R. Broccoli and Harry Saltzman purchased the film rights to The Pass Beyond Kashmir for Columbia Pictures in 1963. Sean Connery and Honor Blackman were to star. Production was to have begun in late 1964 in Britain and on location in the Far East.

Bibliography

Novels
The Achilles Affair (1959)
The Pass Beyond Kashmir (1960)
Genghis Khan (1965) 
The Road and the Star (1965)
The Gold of Malabar (1967)
The Springers (US title: A Spy for a Spy) (1968)
The Break in the Line (US title: The Break) (1971)
The Terminators (1971)
Snowline (1973)
The White Dacoit (1974)
With Extreme Prejudice (1975)
The Memsahib (1977)
The Pagoda Tree (1979) (Far Eastern Trilogy, Book 1)
The Midnight Gun (1981) (Far Eastern Trilogy, Book 2)
The Hour of the Dog (1982) (Far Eastern Trilogy, Book 3)

Short fiction collection
Geth Straker (1962) (contains "Rim of the Wheel", "Alpecchi Reach", "Weed" and "Special Currency")

Uncollected short fiction
 "Dual Control", in Argosy (UK), March 1957
 "Nylon Mask", in Argosy (UK), May 1957
 "Pagoda Well", in Argosy (UK), September 1958
 "Laumoto Incident", in Argosy (UK), June 1959
 "Ski Test", in Argosy (UK), January 1960
 "Returned without Thanks", in Argosy (UK), October 1960; republished as "Cri de Coeur" in Ellery Queen's Mystery Magazine, August 1961 
 "The Fish of My Uncle's Cat", in Ellery Queen's Mystery Magazine, November 1961
 "Blood Feud", in The Saturday Evening Post, 25 August 1962
 "Necklace for a Warrior", in Argosy (UK), December 1962 
 "The Diamond Watch", in The Saturday Evening Post, 8 April 1967
 "Ma Tante Always Done Her Best", in The Saturday Evening Post, December 1968
 "For the Want of a Nail", in Argosy (UK), February 1968; republished as "For Want of a Nail" in Ellery Queen's Mystery Magazine, April 1968
 "Terror Ride", in Ellery Queen's Mystery Magazine, April 1970
 "There's a Moral in it Somewhere", in Argosy (UK), May 1970
 "The Big Bite", in Ellery Queen's Mystery Magazine, December 1970
 "The Rajah's Emeralds", in Ellery Queen's Mystery Magazine, April 1971
 "Treasure Trove", in Ellery Queen's Mystery Magazine, July 1971
 "No Questions Asked", in Ellery Queen's Mystery Magazine, April 1972

References

External links

1909 births
1996 deaths
British male screenwriters
20th-century British novelists
British male novelists
20th-century British male writers
20th-century British screenwriters
Royal Horse Artillery soldiers
Indian Army personnel of World War II
British Indian Army officers
Royal Artillery officers
Military personnel from Gloucestershire